Polynoncus parafurcatus is a species of hide beetle in the subfamily Omorginae found in Argentina and Brazil.

References

parafurcatus
Beetles described in 1987
Beetles of South America